Radfordia palustris is a species of mite in the subgenus Hesperomyobia of the genus Radfordia. It has been recorded on the marsh rice rat (Oryzomys palustris) in Florida, Georgia, and South Carolina.

See also
List of parasites of the marsh rice rat

References

Literature cited
Bochkov, A.V. 1996. Hesperomyobia (Acari: Myobiidae: Radfordia), a new subgenus of myobiid mites from rodents of the family Hesperomyidae (Rodentia). Acarina 4(1–2):39–42.
Whitaker, J.O., Walters, B.L., Castor, L.K., Ritzi, C.M. and Wilson, N. 2007. Host and distribution lists of mites (Acari), parasitic and phoretic, in the hair or on the skin of North American wild mammals north of Mexico: records since 1974. Faculty Publications from the Harold W. Manter Laboratory of Parasitology, University of Nebraska, Lincoln 1:1–173.

Trombidiformes
Arachnids of North America